The Jaguaribe River is a highly seasonal river in Ceará state of northeastern Brazil. Two large dams were constructed across the Jaguaribe, the Orós Dam, completed in 1960, and the Castanhão Dam, completed in 2003. The Castanhão Dam flooded the city of Jaguaribara, which was rebuilt nearby as the city of Nova Jaguaribara.

The Jaguaribe River is formed by the union of the Carrapateiras and Trici rivers, in the municipality of Tauá, both of which originate in the Serra Grande. At Tauá, the Jaguaribe is sandy and rather narrow,  in width. Thus created, the Jaguaribe flows north for about 560 kilometers and enters the Atlantic Ocean. The Jaguaribe is infamous for its unpredictable nature; it runs dry for months before suddenly bursting its banks and flooding nearby towns.

References

Rivers of Ceará